The following is a list of episodes of the television series Dennis the Menace and Gnasher.

Episodes

Series 1 (2009–2010) 
The full list of episodes has been released: The series took a break between 7 October 2009 and 31 January 2010.

Series 2 (2013) 
Series 2 has incorporated Dennis' newly designed parents from weekly comic The Beano. CBBC presenter Chris Johnson has taken on the voice role of Dennis the Menace. It was also noted that Dennis appears more menacing than in the previous series. Michael Stirling of DC Thomson had this say, "will be ABSOLUTELY more menacing…something which will become very clear to everyone when the series is officially publicised." This series took a break between 7 October 2012 and 28 November 2015.

60 Second Dennis (2015-2017) 
35 shorts were also made and air on CBBC. 60 Second Dennis is also the name of a former strip in The Beano.
 
 "Time Machine" (30 November 2015)
 "Dogs Dinner" (6 December 2015)
 "Costume Drama" (3 January 2016)
 "Fore" (8 January 2016)
 "Machine Menace Mayhem" (19 February 2016)
 "Pie Face Off" (25 November 2016)
 "Wax Work Dummy" (2 January 2017)
 "Dry As A Bone" (3 January 2017)
 "Ice Cream Mogul" (19 February 2017)

References 

Lists of Australian animated television series episodes
Lists of Australian children's television series episodes
Lists of British animated television series episodes
Lists of British children's television series episodes
Dennis the Menace and Gnasher